Pettit Memorial Chapel or simply, Pettit Chapel, is one of the few chapels designed by architect Frank Lloyd Wright. The Pettit Chapel is located in the Belvidere Cemetery in Belvidere, Illinois, United States, which is in Boone County. It was listed on the U.S. National Register of Historic Places on December 1, 1978. The chapel is an early example of Frank Lloyd Wright's famed Prairie style. It is one of only two structures  meant for a cemetery setting that Wright ever created.

History
Emma Pettit commissioned Frank Lloyd Wright to design the Pettit Chapel as a memorial to her deceased husband, Dr. William H. Pettit. The building was built in 1907 for US$3,000 and stands next to the grave of Mr. Pettit in Belvidere Cemetery. Doctor William H. Pettit was a beloved physician and humanitarian who had the largest private medical practice in northern Iowa. His sudden passing in 1899 was mourned across the state of Iowa and newspaper accounts from the time indicate that perhaps only the governor of Iowa was more well-liked. After Pettit's death his wife, Emma, deliberated over a suitable memorial to her late husband. She chose a site in Belvidere, Illinois, William Pettit's hometown, and selected a chapel as the memorial. Emma Pettit was led to Frank Lloyd Wright by her brother, William A. Glasner, whose 1905 home in Glencoe, Illinois was designed by Wright.

Pettit Chapel has undergone two periods of restoration during its history. In 1977, the Belvidere Junior Women's Club raised $60,000 to save the chapel, which had deteriorated. The restoration work was matched to Wright's original work through his drawings of the chapel. On June 8, 1981 (Wright's birthday) the chapel was rededicated. From June until November 2003 the chapel underwent its second period of restoration and repair. $40,000 worth of repairs included a new roof, new floorboards for the porch, new steps and painting. The repairs were paid for through a state of Illinois tourism grant and money from a trust fund set up through the cemetery.

Architecture

Original design drawings by Wright show that the front facade of the chapel was to be decorated with a modest fountain and pool, which, along with a small plaque was meant to mark the chapel as a memorial. The sanctuary area of the chapel was labeled as a "recess with memorial" in the original drawings as well. These elements integrated to characterize the chapel as a memorial to Dr. Pettit. The T-shaped building is about 57 ft (17.37 m) by 42 ft (12.8 m), with the cross section being the shorter of the two. The building sits well within the cemetery grounds and is accessible in a car only by cemetery roadways. Its cemetery location is unique among Frank Lloyd Wright buildings as this is the only example of its type.

The interior of the T shape's "stem" is adorned with a fireplace at the T's crossing point. The cross of the T is an open-air, covered porch. The porch not only incorporates the open terrace common to other Wright designed buildings of the era but also has an explicit functionality. Wright meant for the porch to be used by those attending funerals while they waited for cars. The placement of the columns on the porch, pulled back from the open corners is found on other Wright buildings such as the Coonley House and the Martin House. The column placement and Wright's drawings may have influenced European architects after 1910 such as Le Corbusier. The balloon framed building's basement contains restrooms, storage and a furnace room.

The design of the building is such that depending upon how it is viewed it can alternate between symmetrical and asymmetrical. Those angles from which it appears symmetrical express a solemn formality. The low-pitched hipped roof presents the skyline as quiet and unbroken, a feature typical of some of Wright's important early Prairie buildings such as the Heurtley House, and the Winslow House. It embodies the very essence of Frank Lloyd Wright's Prairie style buildings: the roof and its overhanging eaves, the abstract geometric art glass windows, the raised functional floor and the "plastic expression" of the stucco exterior and its contrasting wood trim.

Significance

Pettit Memorial Chapel was added to the U.S. National Register of Historic Places on December 1, 1978. Its nomination form for that listing stated its significance for inclusion as architecture. As the only example of Frank Lloyd Wright's work intended for a cemetery setting it is the only one of his works which can be directly compared with some of Louis Sullivan's acclaimed early modern work meant for a cemetery setting. The Getty Tomb, designed while Wright was a draftsman in Sullivan's office, and the Ryerson and Wainwright Tombs were all designed by Sullivan for a cemetery setting. The Getty Tomb was Sullivan's earliest move toward modern architecture while the Ryerson and Wainwright Tombs brought him further acclaim. Each of the buildings expresses the architect's concept of pure design, Wright's makes the building serve a purpose, while Sullivan's relates directly to the large scale of his commercial works.

The chapel is considered one of the earliest example of Wright's prairie period and was used for funerals until the 1920s when the rise of funeral parlors overtook funerals in churches and chapels. The cemetery itself opened in 1847 and contains 13,000 known graves.

See also
 Unity Chapel

References

Wright, Frank Lloyd. Drawings and Plans of Frank Lloyd Wright: The Early Period (1893–1909), Dover Publications, New York: 1983,. Originally published as Ausgehrführte Bauten und Entwürfe, E. Wasmuth, Berlin: 1910.
 Storrer, William Allin. The Frank Lloyd Wright Companion. University Of Chicago Press, 2006,  (S.116)

Notes

Churches completed in 1907
20th-century churches in the United States
Belvidere, Illinois
Cemetery art
Chapels in the United States
Frank Lloyd Wright buildings
Monuments and memorials in Illinois
National Register of Historic Places in Boone County, Illinois
Properties of religious function on the National Register of Historic Places in Illinois
Buildings and structures in Boone County, Illinois